Musafir is a 2013 Malayalam language action-drama film directed by Pramod Pappan starring Rahman, Mamta Mohandas and Bala. The film was shot in Bangkok, Dubai and London.

The film was initially slated for release in 2009 but was delayed for unknown reasons. Shooting of this movie was completed on 2010 and it was released on 10 May 2013.

Plot 
Anupama is the owner of a multi million business called Parvana Group. She meets a guy called Humayun who was a musician and is looking for a job. Anupama employs him soon they becomes friends. One day Anupama discovers that her brand and business has been transferred to someone. She sues the new company and finds out that it is now owned by Musafair. Musafir was living under the identity of Humayun to fall in love and steal her property. Musafir is a criminal who is under the watch of Interpol. Musafir later reveals to Anupama that he was doing everything for her colleague, Sakthi, to whom he handed over all her wealth. Anupama gives him a counter offer that if he manages to get her back everything that he took away, she will pay him well.

Musafir talks to Sakthi about it which Sakthi denies. Musafir kidnaps Sakthi and locks him in a hotel room. Musafir then brings Anupama to the room but they find Sakthi dead there. Musafir gets to know that Anupama's advocate Menon killed Sakthi from the CCTV visuals. Adv. Menon kidnaps Anupama and tells Musafir that he will give her back if Musafir hands over the CCTV visuals. Musafir hands over the hard drive with visuals to Adv. Menon and he releases Anupama. By that time, police also arrives on the scene because Musafir gave a copy of the visuals to Police prior to the meeting. In the mayhem that follows, Adv. Menon shoots Anupama but Musafir stands on the way thereby getting shot and killed. Adv. Menon gets killed by police in retaliation.

Cast

 Rahman as Musafir
 Mamta Mohandas as Anupama Gopalakrishnan Nair/Business Magnet
 Bala as Sakthi
 Divya Unni as herself (Cameo appearance) 
 Cochin Haneefa as GK / Gopalakrishnan Nair
 Mamukkoya as Kunjahamed
 P. Sreekumar as Adv. Menon / Ahaa Dude

Soundtrack
"Eakayay (female)" - Shweta Mohan
"Kaivala" - Karthik
"Pathinaalam" - Nincy
"Muzafir" - Franko, Balu
"Eakannay Thedunnu" - Ouseppachan
"Fusion" - Ouseppachan

References

External links

2010s Malayalam-language films
2013 films
Films directed by Pramod Pappan
Films scored by Ouseppachan
Films scored by M. G. Radhakrishnan
Films scored by Balabhaskar
Films scored by Shahabaz Aman